The heavyweight competition at the 2015 AIBA World Boxing Championships were held 6–14 October 2015. This is a qualifying tournament for the upcoming 2016 Summer Olympics.

Medalists

Seeds

  Erislandy Savón
  Vasiliy Levit (Quarterfinals)
  Evgeny Tishchenko
  Abdulkadir Abdullayev (Semifinals)

Draw

Finals

Section 1

Section 2

Results

Ranking

References

External links
Draw Sheet

2015 AIBA World Boxing Championships